HOTELS is a trade publication serving the information needs of the worldwide hospitality industry.
 
Established in 1966, HOTELS is published monthly. Regular features include design, food and beverage, technology, and a global update section with industry news, executive interviews and marketing stories. 

Along with monthly print articles, HOTELS posted new content on its Web site every day. Some of this came in the form of press releases and aggregated industry news, while some was original content such as blog posts or podcasts. Topics included green hotelkeeping, sales and marketing, finance & investment, and coverage of hotel conferences. 

As of December 2006, total BPA audited circulation was 62,330 subscribers. The magazine had readers in more than 165 countries around the world.

Former owner Reed Business Information sold off the magazine to its publisher, Dan Hogan, in 2010. Hogan then sold the magazine to Marketing & Technology Group.

References

BPA Worldwide

External links 
HOTELS magazine Web site
"HOTELS" Top Updates

Business magazines published in the United States
Professional and trade magazines
Magazines established in 1966
Magazines published in Chicago